Sheshdeh Rural District is a rural district (dehestan) in Sheshdeh and Qarah Bulaq District, Fasa County, Fars Province, Iran. At the 2006 census, its population was 7,904, in 1,886 families.  The rural district has 11 villages.

References 

Rural Districts of Fars Province
Fasa County